Neil Mackay (born 1969 or 1970) is a Northern Irish, Glasgow-based journalist, author and film maker.

Mackay served as the editor of the Sunday Herald from 2015 to 2018 and is the author of The War on Truth, (2006), All the Little Guns Went Bang Bang (2013), and The Wolf Trial (2017).

Early life and education 
Mackay is from County Antrim, in Northern Ireland. He grew up in The Troubles and was badly beaten at the age of 14. He received a scholarship to attend Queen's University Belfast.

Career 
Mackay worked as a journalist in Northern Ireland, but after receiving deaths threats he moved to Scotland in 1996. In Scotland, he initially worked for The Big Issue before taking a job at Scotland on Sunday in Edinburgh.

In 1999, he was part of the team that launched the Sunday Herald where he became the editor in 2015, and served in that capacity until 2018. In his role he tried to prevent Angela Haggerty from being fired, but did not succeed. In 2003, after a long investigation, he named a British spy who had infiltrated the Irish Republican Army.

In 2004, he agreed a contract to produce television documentaries, subsequently producing Nazi Hate Rock: A Macintyre Investigation for the Scottish Media Group, in 2006.

In 2021, Mackay was the target of online abuse by the Wings over Scotland.

Views 
Mackay is openly critical of religion.

Books

The War on Truth 

The War on Truth Everything You Ever Wanted to Know About the Invasion of Iraq but Your Government Wouldn’t Tell You is Mackay's 2006 account of the events that led up to the war in Iraq. It focuses on the disinformation campaign of the British government and questions the existence of democracy in the UK.

All the Little Guns Went Bang Bang 

All the Little Guns Went Bang Bang is a 2013 social science fiction novel set during The Troubles in Northern Ireland in the 1980s. It tells a tale of two youths, born to violent parents, and explores the extent to which violence is learned by children, from their parents and community.

The Wolf Trial 

The Wolf Trial is a 2017 historical crime novel about a werewolf trial in 16th-century Germany, which is used as a subtext to question if the god in Christianity is an evil or kind deity.

Awards 

 Scottish Press Awards, Columnist of the Year Award, Winner, 2019
 Regional Press Award, Columnist of the Year, Highly Commented, 2020

Personal life 
Mackay lives with post-traumatic stress disorder. He has two daughters.

References

External links 

 Neil Mackay - Twitter

Journalists from Northern Ireland
Living people
Editors from Northern Ireland
21st-century journalists
21st-century writers from Northern Ireland
The Herald (Glasgow) editors
The Herald (Glasgow) people
Television producers from Northern Ireland
21st-century British non-fiction writers
Year of birth missing (living people)
Alumni of Queen's University Belfast